Dialium cochinchinense, the velvet tamarind, is a species of flowering plant in the family Fabaceae. It is native to Ghana, Sri Lanka, Cambodia, Laos, Malaysia, Myanmar, Nigeria, Thailand, Vietnam and many west African countries.  
It is threatened by habitat loss.

References

External links

cochinchinense
Flora of Indo-China
Flora of Peninsular Malaysia
Near threatened flora of Asia
Taxonomy articles created by Polbot